= Patricia Elizée =

Haitian-American attorney

Patricia Elizee
- Born: Haiti
- Occupation(s): attorney and author

Patricia Elizée is a Haitian-American attorney and author. Born in Haiti, she grew up in Miami, Florida. She practices immigration and family law, and served as the president of the Haitian Lawyers Association for 2016-2017. She has published articles in publications such as the Sun Sentinel and the Miami Herald. Françoise Elizée is her sister.
